Nauyrzym is a district of Kostanay Region in northern Kazakhstan. The administrative center of the district is the selo of Karamendy. Population:

Physical and geographical characteristics 
It is located in the south in the middle part of the region. It borders in the north with Auliekolsky district, in the east with Kamystinsky district, in the south — with Amangeldinsky district and Dzhangeldinsky districts, in the west — with Karasu district and Zharkainsky district Akmola region. Aksuat and Zharman lakes are located in the district.

References

Districts of Kazakhstan
Kostanay Region